Acrocercops lysibathra is a moth of the family Gracillariidae, known from Bihar, India. It was described by Edward Meyrick in 1916. The hostplants for the species include Cordia latifolia and Cordia myxa.

References

lysibathra
Moths of Asia
Moths described in 1916